Speak is a 2015 novel by Louisa Hall. It is her second novel, after The Carriage House. The novel was well received. The novel was inspired by a story in the New York Times.

Reception
The novel received praise from critics. The plot was compared favorably with the work of David Mitchell.

References

2015 American novels
2015 science fiction novels
Ecco Press books